Mohan Singh Bundela was an Indian politician belonging to Indian National Congress. He was elected as a member of Madhya Pradesh Legislative Assembly from Dhar in 1985. He died on 13 February 2019 at the age of 74.

References

1940s births
2019 deaths
Indian National Congress politicians
Madhya Pradesh MLAs 1985–1990